Arkham is a fictional city situated in Massachusetts. An integral part of the Lovecraft Country setting created by H. P. Lovecraft, Arkham is featured in many of his stories and those of other Cthulhu Mythos writers.

Arkham House, a publishing company started by two of Lovecraft's correspondents, August Derleth and Donald Wandrei, takes its name from this city as a tribute. Arkham Asylum, a fictional mental hospital in DC Comics' Batman mythos, is also named after Lovecraft's Arkham.

In Lovecraft's stories
Arkham is the home of Miskatonic University, which features prominently in many of Lovecraft's works. The institution finances the expeditions in the novellas, At the Mountains of Madness (1936) and The Shadow Out of Time (1936). Walter Gilman, of "The Dreams in the Witch House" (1933), attends classes at the university. Other notable institutions in Arkham are the Arkham Historical Society and the Arkham Sanitarium. It is said in "Herbert West—Reanimator" that the town was devastated by a typhoid outbreak in 1905.

Arkham's main newspaper is the Arkham Advertiser, which has a circulation that reaches as far as Dunwich.  In the 1880s, its newspaper is called the Arkham Gazette.

Arkham's most notable characteristics are its gambrel roofs and the dark legends that have surrounded the city for centuries.

Location
The precise location of Arkham is unspecified, although it is probably near both Innsmouth and Dunwich. However, it may be surmised from Lovecraft's stories that it is some distance to the north of Boston, probably in Essex County, Massachusetts. A more recent mapping of Lovecraft Country reinforces this suggestion, with Arkham being situated close to the location of Gordon College; in Lovecraft's work this would presumably be replaced by Miskatonic University itself. 

The actual location of Arkham is a subject of debate. Will Murray places Arkham in central Massachusetts and suggests it is based on the village of Oakham. Robert D. Marten rejects this and equates Arkham with Salem, with its name coming from Arkwright, Rhode Island (now part of Fiskville).

August Derleth describes Arkham as "Lovecraft's own well-known, widely used place-name for legend-haunted Salem, Massachusetts", and Lovecraft himself, in a letter to F. Lee Baldwin dated April 29, 1934, wrote that "[my] mental picture of Arkham is of a town something like Salem in atmosphere [and] style of houses, but more hilly [and] with a college (which Salem [lacks]) ... I place the town [and] the imaginary Miskatonic [River] somewhere north of Salem—perhaps near Manchester."

Arkham Sanitarium appears in the short story "The Thing on the Doorstep" and may have been inspired by the Danvers State Insane Asylum, aka Danvers State Hospital, located in Danvers, Massachusetts. (Danvers State Hospital itself appears in Lovecraft's stories "Pickman's Model" and The Shadow over Innsmouth.)

Appearances

Lovecraft's fiction
Note: dates are the year written.

Arkham first appeared in Lovecraft's short story "The Picture in the House" (1920)—the story is also the first to mention "Miskatonic".

It appears in other stories by Lovecraft, including:
 "Herbert West–Reanimator" (1921–1922); first story to mention "Miskatonic University"
 "The Unnamable" (1923)
 "The Silver Key" (1926)
 "The Colour Out of Space" (1927)
 "The Dunwich Horror" (1928)
 "The Whisperer in Darkness"  (1930); Albert N. Wilmarth is described as a folklorist and assistant professor of English at Miskatonic University.
 At the Mountains of Madness (1931); one of the ships is named Arkham
 The Shadow over Innsmouth (1931)
 "The Dreams in the Witch House" (1932)
 "Through the Gates of the Silver Key" (1932–1933)
 "The Thing on the Doorstep" (1933); first to mention "Arkham Sanitarium"
 "The Shadow Out of Time" (1934–1935)

Other appearances

 In the DC Universe, Arkham Asylum is a high-security asylum for dangerous psychopaths where many Gotham City supervillains, including the Joker, are kept under guard. The name was picked by editor Jack C. Harris and writer Dennis O'Neil in homage to Lovecraft. In the fictional universe, it was run by the Arkham family, namely Amadeus Arkham, giving it its name.
 Arkham Horror is a cooperative adventure board-game themed around H. P. Lovecraft's Cthulhu Mythos. The game has players exploring the town of Arkham as they attempt to stop unmentionable horrors from spilling into the world.
 Splatterhouse takes place in the setting of Arkham, Massachusetts.
 Arkham is the setting for the 1963 film The Haunted Palace directed by Roger Corman, based on the H. P. Lovecraft novella The Case of Charles Dexter Ward.
 Arkham appears in "The Collect Call of Cthulhu", episode 32 from season 2 of The Real Ghostbusters (October 27, 1987), when members of the Ghostbusters go to Miskatonic University to get information on how to stop Cthulhu.
 "An Arkham Halloween", a short story appearing in Bewildering Stories, in which The Wandering Jew volunteers to aid Miskatonic University in preparing a modern translation of the Necronomicon, meets a descendant of Edgar Allan Poe's protagonist in The "Tell Tale Heart", and battles Dracula.  Reprinted in author's collection, 'Weird Thoughts'.

Novels
 Arkham is the primary setting of Lovecraftian: The Shipwright Circle by Steven Philip Jones. The Lovecraftian series reimagines the weird tales of H. P. Lovecraft into one single universal modern epic.
 Arkham is the setting for all of the stories in the 2006 anthology Arkham Tales published by Chaosium.
 In the 2005 novel The Arcanum, Lovecraft himself is said to have been involved in solving a case involving a witch cult in Arkham.
 Arkham is mentioned in two novels by author Charles Stross. In The Atrocity Archives, a philosopher is attracted to Arkham due to the "unique library" there. In The Jennifer Morgue, the occult branch of the American intelligence community, code-named "Black Chamber", is headquartered in Arkham.

Notes

References

Primary sources
 Lovecraft, Howard P.
 At the Mountains of Madness, and Other Novels (7th corrected printing), S. T. Joshi (ed.), Sauk City, WI: Arkham House, 1985.  . Definitive version.
 Dagon and Other Macabre Tales, S. T. Joshi (ed.), Sauk City, WI: Arkham House, 1987. . Definitive version.
 The Dunwich Horror and Others (9th corrected printing), S. T. Joshi (ed.), Sauk City, WI: Arkham House, 1984. . Definitive version.

Secondary sources

Books

Web sites

External links
 "Lovecraft's Map of Arkham", from The Cthulhu Mythos: A Guide

Cthulhu Mythos locations
Fictional elements introduced in 1920
Fictional populated places in Massachusetts